Little Bear is a short drama film written by Daire Glynn and directed by both Daire Glynn and Ger Duffy. The film was produced by Felipa Robertson with U2's The Edge featuring as one of the film's Executive Producers. Ivor Noyek designed the artwork for one of the film's promotional posters. The score for the film was written by Irish multi-instrumentalist, Ruairi Lynch (a.k.a. Bantum)

Narrative 
A short story of friendship, love and imagination.

Cast 
 Kieran O'Reilly - Man
 Kojii Helnwein - Woman
 Calum Heath - Boy

Critical reception 
The film had its world premiere at the Vancouver International Film Festival in October 2015 where it was only one of two Irish short films to be screened. Little Bear won the Audience Award at the Dublin International Film Festival 2016. Little Bear also won Best Original Score at the Top Shorts Online Film Festival in addition to three 'Honorable Mentions' for Director, Drama and Child Actor.

Awards and nominations

References

External links

2015 films
Irish short films
English-language Irish films
2015 short films
2010s English-language films